The Church of St Michael and All Angels is a Norman stone church in the village of Harbledown, near Canterbury, England. A part of the Church of England, it follows the Anglo-Catholic tradition, is a parish of the Society of Saint Wilfrid and Saint Hilda, is under the care of the Bishop of Richborough and is served by clergy of the Society of the Holy Cross. It has been listed Grade II on the National Heritage List for England since January 1967.

History
The church was built around 1160 but received an enlargement during the 13th century and twice during the 19th century; a north transept was built in 1825 but later demolished in 1881 to make way for a new chancel and nave, designed by J. P. St Aubyn, doubling the size of the original church.

Mission Church of St Gabriel, Rough Common 

In 1890 the Mission Church of St Gabriel was established nearby in Rough Common as a sister church; it is nicknamed the 'Tin Tabernacle'. The east window, above the altar, was saved from St Paul's Church in Ramsgate after it was bombed during the Second World War.

References 

12th-century establishments
Anglo-Catholic church buildings in Kent
Buildings and structures in Canterbury
Churches completed in 1881
Diocese of Canterbury
Grade II listed churches in Kent